Grete Ayache  (born 12 March 1982 in Tallinn, Estonia), born as Grete Püvi, is an Estonian dressage rider. Representing Estonia, she competed at the 2014 World Equestrian Games and at the 2011 European Dressage Championship. She placed 61st place in individual dressage at the 2011 Europeans held in Rotterdam. 

She retired her Grand Prix horse, Talent, from the competition in 2016. The horse had been previously ridden by Bernard Bosseaux.

In 2017 she won 3rd place in the FEI World Cup Dressage Central European League Freestyle competition.

Personal
Grete started riding at the age of 12. She made her international debut in 2005 during the CDI in Warka, Poland. She is married to the reserve rider for the French Olympic team in 2016; Alexandre Ayache and together they have a daughter. She lives in Nice, France.

Her sister Pirjo Püvi is an opera singer and her uncle is Leo Näppinen, an Estonian scientist. Grete is fluent in Estonian, French, English, German, Finnish and Russian.

Personal bests

References

Living people
1982 births
Sportspeople from Tallinn
Estonian female equestrians
Estonian dressage riders